Fayetteville Veterans Administration Hospital Historic District is a national historic district located at Fayetteville, Cumberland County, North Carolina.  It encompasses 8 contributing buildings, 1 contributing site, 1 contributing structure, and 1 contributing object on the medical center campus.  They include the main building/outpatient clinic (1939), service building (1939), manager's quarters (1939), attendants’ quarters (1939), laundry building (1939), the flag pole (1939), and the attendants’ quarters (1939).  Also located in the district is the separately listed Confederate Breastworks.

It was listed on the National Register of Historic Places in 2012.

References

Veterans Affairs medical facilities
Hospital buildings on the National Register of Historic Places in North Carolina
Historic districts on the National Register of Historic Places in North Carolina
Colonial Revival architecture in North Carolina
Buildings and structures in Fayetteville, North Carolina
National Register of Historic Places in Cumberland County, North Carolina